William W. Snow (April 27, 1812 – September 3, 1886) was an American businessman and politician who served one term as a United States representative from New York from 1851 to 1853.

Biography 
Snow was born in Heath, Franklin County, Massachusetts on April 27, 1812. He attended the public schools before learning the trade of wool-carder and cloth dresser. He moved in 1841 to Oneonta, New York in 1831 and engaged in the wool-carding business.
The following year entered the tin and hardware business and also engaged in agricultural pursuits.

Political career 
He was member of the New York State Assembly (Otsego Co.) in 1844.

Congress 
He was elected as a Democrat to the Thirty-second Congress (March 4, 1851 – March 3, 1853).

Politics after Congress 
He was again a member of the New York State Assembly (Otsego Co., 2nd D.) in 1870.

He then served as supervisor of the town of Oneonta in 1873 and 1874.

Later career and death 
He later served as State excise commissioner in 1877, then was member of the village board of trustees. He also engaged in banking.

Smith died in Oneonta, New York on September 3, 1886 and was interred in Riverside Cemetery.

External links

 
 

1812 births
1886 deaths
Democratic Party members of the New York State Assembly
Democratic Party members of the United States House of Representatives from New York (state)
People from Heath, Massachusetts
People from Oneonta, New York
19th-century American politicians